Kunst und Künstler: illustrierte Monatsschrift für bildende Kunst und Kunstgewerbe was a German periodical, that shaped the reception of art during the first third of the 20th century. It was in circulation between 1902 and 1933.

History
Founded by Bruno Cassirer in Berlin-Tiergarten as probably his best-known publication, the monthly soon became the most influential publication for the art-interested public. From 1907 it was edited by the art critic and publicist Karl Scheffler, a committed advocate of contemporary European art. Thanks in part to his journalistic influence, the art movement of Impressionism, which was still highly controversial in Germany in the years before World War I, was increasingly accepted by the public of the time.

In terms of content, the magazine was devoted exclusively to the visual arts, publishing primarily reviews and critiques of works that were simultaneously printed as reproductions in the issues. Illustrations and original prints by participating artists such as Arnold Böcklin, Anselm Feuerbach, Max Klinger, Max Liebermann, Giovanni Segantini, Max Slevogt, Hans Thoma, Wilhelm Trübner, and Karl Walser, some of whom also appeared as authors, marked the special feature of this periodical. In addition, contributions on art history, art theory, and scientific topics by renowned experts appeared regularly; the number and significance of which ensured the lasting reputation and success of this monthly magazine and document its standing to this day.

After the Nazis seized power, the journal was discontinued. The last issue was published in January 1933.

Authors
In the course of its 31 years of publication, around 350 authors contributed to the magazine. A

 Paul Adler
 Friedrich Ahlers-Hestermann
 Wilken von Alten
 Walter Andrae
 Hans Ankwicz-Kleehoven
 Andreas Aubert
 Julius Aufseesser (1878–1942)

 B

 Ludwig Bachhofer (1894–1976)
 Bernhard Baer (1905–1983)
 Gustav Barthel (1903–1973)
 Otto Bartning
 Adolphe Basler
 Hermann Beenken
 Ida Beer-Walbrunn
 Walter Curt Behrendt
 Otto Benesch
 Ernst Benkard
 Émile Bernard
 Ignaz Beth
 Hans Bethge
 André Beaunier
 Kurt Biebrach (1882–19??)
 Justus Bier
 Vitale Bloch (1900–1975)
 Elfried Bock (1880–1960)
 Wilhelm von Bode
 Max von Boehn
 Hans Börger (1880–1971)
 Walter Bombe (1873–1946)
 Walter Bondy
 Ludwig Borchardt
 Wolfgang Born (1893–1949)
 Ludwig Burchard
 Georg Brandes
 Max Braumann (1880–1969)
 Robert Breuer
 Albert E. Brinckmann
 Justus Brinckmann
 Wolfgang Bruhn
 Heinrich Bulle

 C

 Charles Camoin
 Maxime Du Camp
 Carl Capek
 Eugène Carrière
 Walter Cohen
 William Cohn
 Lovis Corinth
 Edward Gordon Craig

 D

 Robert Dangers
 Theodor Demmler
 Maurice Denis
 Werner R. Deusch
 Victor Dirksen
 Walter Dittmann
 Albert Dresdner
 Marie Dormoy
 Friedrich Dörnhöffer
 Théodore Duret

 E

 Kurt Karl Eberlein
 Rudolph Eberstadt
 Hans Eckstein
 Mussia Eisenstadt
 Max Eisler (1881–1937)
 Bruno Eisner (1884–1978)
 Julius Elias
 Alexander Eliasberg
 August Endell
 Julius Engel
 Paul Ernst
 Herbert Eulenberg

 F

 Hans von Faber du Faur
 Otto von Falke
 Hedwig Fechheimer
 Paul Fechter
 Arnold Federmann
 Conrad Felixmüller
 Karl Figdor
 Oskar Fischel
 Adolf Fischer
 Otto Fischer
 Theodor Fontane
 K. Fried
 Max Friedländer
 Walter Friedlaender
 Fritz Friedrichs
 Efraim Frisch

 G

 Hermann Ganz
 Gustave Geffroy
 Hermann Gehri
 Oscar Gehrig
 Willi Geiger
 Kurt Gerstenberg
 Otto Gerstenberg
 Curt Glaser
 Heinrich Glück
 Erhard Göpel
 Alfred Gold
 Adolph Goldschmidt
 Botho Graef
 Robert Graf
 Richard Graul
 Otto Grautoff
 Curt Gravencamp
 August Griesebach
 Rudolf Grossmann
 Ernst Grosse
 George Grosz
 Ludwig Grote
 Cornelius Gurlitt

 H

 Hugo Haberfeld
 Curt Habicht
 Hugo Häring
 Karl Hagemeister
 Richard Hamann
 Erich Hancke (1871–1954)
 Ernst Harms
 Gustav Friedrich Hartlaub
 Gerhart Hauptmann
 Wilhelm Hausenstein
 Emil Heilbut
 Thomas Theodor Heine
 Anna Wertheimer
 Gottfried Heinersdorff
 Carl Georg Heise
 Fritz Hellwag (1871–1950)
 Paul Henning
 Elisbeth Henschel-Simon (1897–1946)
 Wolfgang Herrmann
 Eduard Heyck
 Alfred Walter Heymel
 Hans Hildebrandt
 Ludwig Hilberseimer
 Marlice Hinz (1903–19??)
 Dora Hitz
 Heinrich Höhn (1881–1942)
 Otto Höver
 Hugo von Hofmannsthal
 Ernst Hohenemser (1870–1954)
 Arthur Holitscher
 Walter Hugelshofer (1899–1987)
 Hans Huth (1892–1977)

 I

 Jozef Israëls

 J

 Karl Wilhelm Jähnig (1888–1960)
 Hans Jantzen
 Georges Jeanniot
 Gotthard Jedlicka
 Peter Jessen
 André Jolles

 K

 Hans Karlinger
 Hans Kauffmann
 Hugo Kehrer
 Martin Kessel
 Harry Kessler
 Ellen Key
 Eduard von Keyserling
 Hermann Graf Keyserling
 J. Kirchner
 Erich Klossowski
 Kurt Kluge
 Karl Koch
 Karl Koetschau
 Eduard Kolloff
 Christian Koren-Wiberg
 Siegfried Kracauer
 Paul Kristeller
 Alfred Kubin
 Ernst Kühnel
 Otto Kümmel
 Alfred Kuhn
 Kurt Kusenberg

 L

 Jules Laforgue
 Albert Lamm
 Franz Landsberger
 Carl Larsson
 C. I. Lauweriks
 Julius Levin
 Alfred Lichtwark
 Max Liebermann
 Helmuth Liesegang
 Carl Linfert
 Frits Lugt
 Joseph August Lux
 Eugen Lüthgen

 M

 Dugald Sutherland MacColl
 Hans Mackowsky
 Paul Mahlberg
 Klaus Mann
 Günther Martin (1896–1944)
 Kurt Martin
 Roger Marx
 Anton Mayer
 Margarete Mauthner (trans)
 August Liebmann Mayer
 J. Mayr
 Hans Meid
 Ludwig Meidner
 Julius Meier-Graefe
 Peter Meyer
 Max Meyerfeld
 Paul Friedrich Meyerheim
 Ernst Michalski (1901–1936)
 Leo Michelson
 Wilhelm Modersohn
 George Augustus Moore
 Christian Morgenstern
 Ludwig Moser
 Thomas Muchall-Viebrook
 Konrad Müller-Kaboth
 Hermann Muthesius

 N

 Fritz Neugass
 Carl Neumann
 Alfred Neumeyer
 Georg Nordensvan

 O

 Emil Orlik
 Karl Ernst Osthaus
 Konrad Ott

 P

 Walter Paatz
 Gustav Pauli
 Anton von Perfall
 Eduard Plietzsch (1886–1961)
 Otto Pniower
 Georg Poensgen
 Josef Ponten
 Josef Poppelreuter
 Felix Poppenberg
 Leó Popper
 Hans Posse
 Hermann Post
 Emil Preetorius
 Antonin Proust
 Heinrich Pudor
 Hans Purrmann

 R

 Louis Réau
 Heribert Reiners
 Paul Renner
 Magda Révész-Alexander (1885–1972)
 Fritz Rhein
 Richard Riemerschmid
 Rainer Maria Rilke
 Grete Ring
 Arthur Roessler
 Franz Roh
 Johan Rohde (1856–1935)
 Jakob Rosenberg
 Hans Rosenhagen
 Severin Rüttgers
 Udo Rukser
 Fritz Rumpf

 S

 Friedrich Sarre
 Max Sauerlandt
 Karl Schaefer
 Hans Otto Schaller
 Rosa Schapire
 Karl Scheffler
 Gustav Schiefler
 Hermann Schlittgen
 Paul Ferdinand Schmidt
 Robert Schmidt
 Karl Schmidt-Hellerau
 Hermann Schmitz
 Karl Schnaase
 Arthur von Schneider (1886–1968)
 Ludwig Schnorr von Carolsfeld
 W. Scholz
 Bruno Schröder
 Anna Schubert
 Edmund Schüler (1873–1953)
 Marie Schuette
 Wolfgang Schütz
 Richard L.F. Schulz
 Ernst Schur
 Günther Schwark
 Max Schwimmer
 Richard Sedlmaier
 Richard Seewald
 Woldemar von Seidlitz
 Seiffert-Wattenberg
 Franz Servaes
 Oswald Sickert
 Hans Wolfgang Singer
 Alfred Sisley
 Max Slevogt
 Fritz Stahl
 Kurt Steinbart
 Walter Stengel
 Jan Benno Stokvis
 Georg Swarzenski
 Eckart von Sydow (1885–1942)
 Ladislas Szecsi
 Felix Szkolny

 T

 Werner Technau
 Edith von Térey
 Gabriel von Térey
 Heinrich Tessenow
 Jens Thiis
 Hans Tietze
 Erica Tietze-Conrat
 Georg Treu
 Hugo Troendle
 Johannes Trojan
 Wilhelm Trübner
 Hugo von Tschudi

 U

 Hermann Ubell
 Hermann Uhde-Bernays
 Otto Unrein
 Emil Utitz

 V

 Wilhelm Reinhold Valentiner
 Henry van de Velde
 Louis Vauxelles
 Jan Veth
 Robert Vischer
 Karl Voll
 Ambroise Vollard
 Hans Vollmer
 Hermann Voss

 W

 Wilhelm Waetzoldt
 Emil Waldmann
 Ernst Waldschmidt
 Victor Wallerstein
 Robert Walser
 George Frederic Watts
 Hermann von Wedderkop
 Ernst Weil (1891–1965)
 Kurt Wehlte
 Werner Weisbach
 Heinrich Weizsäcker
 Hans Wendland
 Otto Wenzel
 Paul Wescher
 Fritz Wichert
 Richard Wilde
 Franz Winter
 Fritz Witte
 Heinrich Wölfflin
 Willi Wolfradt
 Wilhelm Worringer
 Ernst Würtenberger

 Z

 Christian Zervos
 Heinrich Zille
 Otto Zoff
 Paul Zucker

References

Further reading
 "Kunst und Künstler (1902–1933)" @ the University of Heidelberg
 Günter Feist, Ursula Feist (Eds.): Kunst und Künstler. Aus 32 Jahrgängen einer deutschen Kunstzeitschrift, Mainz, Florian Kupferberg, 1971
 Sigrun Paas: Kunst und Künstler 1902-1933. Eine Zeitschrift in der Auseinandersetzung um den Impressionismus in Deutschland, Heidelberg (Dissertation) 1976,

External links

  (Holdings at the Zeitschriften Databank)
  (Entry at WorldCat)
 Heidelberg Historic Literature

Defunct magazines published in Germany
Magazines established in 1902
Magazines disestablished in 1933
German-language magazines
Magazines published in Berlin
Monthly magazines published in Germany